Yves Hess is a Swiss curler from Zug.

Teams

Men's

Mixed

Mixed doubles

References

External links

 
 Team Zug Cablex
 
 Yves Hess - Technical Sales Manager - prophysics AG | XING
 Yves Hess - Prophysics AG
 Video:
 
 

Living people

People from Zug
Sportspeople from the canton of Zug
Swiss male curlers
Swiss curling champions
Universiade medalists in curling
Year of birth missing (living people)
Place of birth missing (living people)
Universiade silver medalists for Switzerland
Medalists at the 2003 Winter Universiade